Dilip Patel is an Indian politician and a member of parliament to the 16th Lok Sabha from Anand (Lok Sabha constituency), Gujarat. He won the 2014 Indian general election being a Bharatiya Janata Party candidate.

References

India MPs 2014–2019
Lok Sabha members from Gujarat
Bharatiya Janata Party politicians from Gujarat
People from Anand district
1955 births
Living people